Down Home Style is an album by American organist Brother Jack McDuff recorded in 1969 and released on the Blue Note label.

Reception
The Allmusic review by Stephen Thomas Erlewine awarded the album 4 stars and stated "A set of gritty electric funk and soulful blues, Down Home Style is an excellent showcase for Brother Jack McDuff's gripping, funky style... the record is designed as a showcase for McDuff's wild, intoxicating Hammond organ, and he runs with the it, demonstrating every one of his tricks".

Track listing
All compositions by Jack McDuff except as indicated
 "The Vibrator" - 4:48 
 "Down Home Style" - 5:06 
 "Memphis in June" (Hoagy Carmichael, Paul Francis Webster) - 4:16 
 "Theme from Electric Surfboard" - 3:34 
 "It's All a Joke" - 3:48 
 "Butter (For Yo Popcorn)" - 4:08 
 "Groovin'" (Eddie Brigati, Felix Cavaliere) - 5:18 
 "As She Walked Away" - 8:01 
Recorded in Memphis, Tennessee on June 10, 1969.

Personnel
Brother Jack McDuff - organ 
Jay Arnold - tenor saxophone  
Charlie Freeman - guitar
James Alexander - electric bass
Sammy Creason - drums
Unidentified large band (tracks 2, 3 & 6)

References

 

Blue Note Records albums
Jack McDuff albums
1969 albums